Resonate Group Limited is a British software, technology and services company.  It was called DeltaRail Group Limited until renamed and re-branded in September 2016.

The company was formed from Rail business of AEA Technology plc which was acquired as part of a secondary private equity portfolio sale to Vision Capital in 2006.  Previously, in 1998, AEA Technology plc formed the Rail business having acquired British Rail Research from the British Railways Board, and a number of other engineering software organisations. On 21 January 2015, the four Executive Directors of the company acquired the business out of private equity ownership.

Resonate provides software, technology and services in three core areas; signalling control software, operational software and asset management products.

Resonate develops and maintains the Integrated Electronic Control Centre (IECC) widely used on Britain's rail networks.

The company has UK offices in Derby (head office) and London.

References 

Companies based in Derby
Rail transport in Derby
Railway companies of the United Kingdom
Railway infrastructure companies
Technology companies established in 2006
British companies established in 2006
2006 establishments in England